The Secret to Happiness Is Love ( x4) is a studio album by Taiwanese artist Vivian Hsu. It was released September 28, 2003, by Avex Taiwan. The original title Wǒ Ài Nǐ means "I Love You". There were three versions of this album produced: a limited edition with artbook, a preorder edition with artbook and bonus single CD, and a regular edition without the artbook, but with a VCD containing music videos.

The album contains Hsu's first rap song, Mianju, which was later featured in the compilation album Ji Le 175. Also featured is Jueding Ai Ni, the theme song to the TV series Love Storm, in which Hsu starred in.

Track listing

Original CD
"" (py. Wángzǐ Biàn Qīngwā) – 5:06
"" (py. Sì Cì Dōu Ài Nǐ) – 3:47
"Dream" – 4:37
"" (py. Miànjù, en. Mask) – 4:25
"" (py. Juédìng Ài Nǐ, en. Decide to Love You) – 4:21
"" (py. Wō Zuìhǎo de Péngyōu) – 4:44
"" (py. Jiéhān Duì Bùduì) – 4:37
"" (py. Tiánmì de Zhémó) – 4:12
"" (Doshite, py. Wèishénme, en. Why) – 4:14
"" (py. Zǐdàn, en. Bullet) – 2:55
"Baby Baby" – 3:39

CD 2 (preorder edition only)
  <love mix> – 4:31
  <TV mix> – 4:24
  <karaoke> – 4:21

References

Vivian Hsu albums
2003 albums